ams OSRAM AG, formerly known as austriamicrosystems AG (originated from Austria Mikro Systeme) and ams AG (before acquiring OSRAM), is an Austrian electronics company that designs and manufactures sensors for small form factor, low power, highest sensitivity and multi-sensor applications. Products include sensors, sensor ICs, interfaces and related software for mobile, consumer, communications, industrial, medical, and automotive markets.

In 2020 ams AG acquired the German lighting, LED, and opto-semiconductor manufacturer OSRAM. Since then, the company operates under the name ams OSRAM.

Headquartered in Austria, ams OSRAM employs over 24,000 people globally. ams OSRAM is listed on the SIX Swiss stock exchange (ticker symbol: AMS).

History

1978–2000
Voestalpine AG decides to expand its product and services range during the late 1970s and chooses the semiconductor industry. Due to voestalpine looking for a joint venture partner the first cooperation with AMI (American Microsystems, Inc., later AMI Semiconductor, now part of onsemi) was formed.

In 1981, this joint venture resulted in the American Micro Systems Incorporated-Austria GmbH (AMI-A). AMI owned 51% and voestalpine AG 49%. The Schloss Premstätten in Unterpremstätten (Styria, Austria) was chosen as headquarters.

In 1983, the Austrian chancellor Fred Sinowatz officially opened the 100 mm wafer factory which started its production with 300 employees.

1987 was the year when voestalpine AG took over full ownership. In September of the same year the name was changed from AMI-A to AMS (Austria Mikro Systeme International GmbH). Furthermore, there were new sales branches established in California and Germany.

In 1991, ams became one of the 25 fastest growing businesses in Europe. ams was chosen to be the "top Fab of 1992".

In June 1993, ams was the first semiconductor company in Europe to go public, at the Vienna stock exchange.

ams opened the first sales office in Asia in 1996, the company was also accredited according to the ISO 14001:1996 and EMAS. In 1997, AMS achieved first successes in the area of deep sub-micron technologies.

NASA's "Deep Space 2" mission in 1998 took off with 2 chips developed from ams and the aircraft manufacturer Boeing. These chips were designed to manage the power supply of the whole space probe. In the same year the company was accredited according to the American and German automotive industry, QS 9000 and VDA 6.1 respectively.

In 2000, ams set the foundation for the new 200 mm wafer factory. With the support of its new private equity shareholder Permira, ams left the Vienna stock exchange the same year. This resulted in a further name change to austriamicrosystems AG.

2001–2010

The new 200 mm production line starts its trial run. At the same time a license agreement has been reached between austriamicrosystems AG and TSMC (Taiwan Semiconductor Manufacturing Company Ltd.), the largest global IC foundry. After the successful trial run the new 200 mm wafer factory goes ahead with the mass production in 2002. New sales offices in Singapore were opened in the same year, furthermore an expansion of locations in Hong Kong, Japan and the USA was carried out.

Silicon Strategies listed austriamicrosystems as the only European company under the top ten 2003 foundries worldwide. austriamicrosystems AG decided to continue its policy of expansion with new sales offices in South Korea, China (Suzhou), Finland and Sweden. Additionally, a design center for multimedia playback applications was set up in Bangalore, India.

2004 was the year austriamicrosystems AG found its way back to the stock exchange. Since 17 May that year austriamicrosystems AG is listed on the Swiss Stock Exchange, short SIX, in Zürich.

In 2005, the standard products as well as the capacity of the 200 mm wafer factory were expanded to compensate for the shut down of the old 100 mm factory which played a main part in the success of austriamicrosystems AG.

In 2006, the year of the 25th anniversary, a new test centre in the Philippines and a new design centre in India were built. The 200 mm wafer factory was also expanded further.

In 2007, austriamicrosystems AG stepped into new business segments in the form of a partnership with the micro motor manufacturer New Scale Technologies. In the same year the new cafeteria & conference centre (CCC) was built by the architect DI Tinchon.

ams AG reduced emissions and plans in the mid term to produce CO2-free. Nevertheless, austriamicrosystems AG reached revenues amounting to EUR 209.4m in 2010.

2011–present
In 2011, austriamicrosystems acquired 100% of the shares in Texas Advanced Optoelectronic Solutions, Inc. (TAOS), for about US$320 million (about EUR 220m). TAOS works in the area of light sensor technologies.

In May 2012, austriamicrosystems rebrands to "ams". The new brand name ams conjoins austriamicrosystems and the brand of TAOS, a supplier of intelligent lights sensors, acquired in 2011. Furthermore, ams AG acquired IDS Microchip AG in the same year.

Since 13 May 2013, Kirk Laney, former CEO of TAOS Inc., took over the interim management of the company after the step down of John Heugle, head of company for 11 years.

In June 2014, ams acquired 100% of shares in AppliedSensor, a maker of solid-state chemical gas sensors.

On 25 June 2014, ams published a statement of a possible merger of equals with Dialog Semiconductor.

In July 2015, ams acquired the advanced CMOS sensor business from NXP.

In November 2015, ams acquired CMOSIS, a supplier of area scan and miniature medical CMOS image sensors.

In June 2016, ams acquired CCMOSS.

In July 2016, ams acquired color and spectral sensing specialist MAZeT.

In October 2016, ams acquired optical packaging firm Heptagon.

In December 2016, ams acquired Incus Laboratories, active in active noise cancellation in headphones and earphones.

In March 2017, ams acquired 100% of the shares in Princeton Optronics, Inc., a provider of Vertical Cavity Surface-Emitting Lasers (VCSELs), in an all-cash transaction. In September 2017, AMS announced that it would be opening site under $200 million plan in Singapore.

In March 2019, ams and Wise Road Capital, a global private equity firm focusing on the semiconductor industry and other emerging high-tech industries, create a joint venture to advance the development and sales of environmental, flow and pressure sensor solutions for the global market.

In April 2019, ams share value surged 20% after offering their 3D sensor technology to Android makers, that was once exclusive to their largest client, Apple.

In December 2019, ams successfully closed their acquisition of German lighting, LED, and opto-semiconductor manufacturer, OSRAM.

Managing board 
In 2020, the board was composed of:
 Aldo Kamper (CEO since 2023)
 Ingo Bank (CFO since 2020)
 Thomas Stockmeier (COO since 2014)
 Mark Hamersma (Chief Business Development Officer since 2018)

Key figure 
Financial and employees number of last year.

Shareholder structure 
ams-OSRAM AG is listed on the SIX Swiss Exchange (ticker symbol: AMS) since 2004. Approx. 95% of the shares are free float, around 5% are held by ams-OSRAM AG as treasury shares.

Business segments 
ams OSRAM's activities are organized into two main business segments, Semiconductors and Lamps & Systems. The Semiconductors segment includes semiconductor-based products such as high-performance LEDs, lasers, and optical sensors for business customers in the automotive, consumer, and industrial end markets. The Lamps & Systems segment includes traditional lamps and lighting systems for automotive, industrial and medical end markets.

In the first half of the fiscal year 2022 the Semiconductors business segment contributed 68% of the group's revenues while the Lamps & Systems segment contributed 32%.

Within the automotive market, the range of ams OSRAM products includes illumination solutions for front- and back-lighting, components for LED-based products and traditional light sources and interior lighting solutions. The company also provides sensing solutions for the automotive end markets such as in-cabin sensing or exterior sensing required for ADAS.

The automotive end market accounted for 40% of the group's total revenues in the first half of 2022.

ams OSRAM has been named as one of the leading automotive LED vendors.

In the consumer end market ams OSRAM serves companies for mobile wearables devices. The main focus areas are sensing solutions for applications such as ambient light sensing, camera enhancement solutions and vital signs monitoring.

The consumer end market accounted for 24% of the group's total revenues in the first half of 2022.

In the area of industrial and medical end markets ams OSRAM provides primarily illumination and sensor solutions. Their illumination products include LEDs for horticulture lighting, outdoor / industry lighting and UV-C LEDs for treatment purposes. Their sensing solutions include components for home & building automation, robotics and medical imaging such as CT sensor modules.

The industrial and medical end market accounted for 36% of the group's total revenues in the first half of 2022.

Research and development 
ams OSRAM consistently invests in research and development. In 2016, research and development expenses totaled EUR 138.9m - corresponding to 25% of revenue. On average, the research and development department included 677 employees. In 2021, research and development expenses totaled EUR 642m (13% of revenue) and included 3,445 employees on average.

References 

Foundry semiconductor companies
Sensor manufacturers
Semiconductor companies of Austria
Electronics companies established in 1981
Companies listed on the SIX Swiss Exchange
Austrian brands
Economy of Styria